Re Oatway [1903] 2 Ch 356 is an English trusts law case, concerning tracing.

Facts
Mr Oatway was a trustee of Charles Skipper’s will. He took £3000 of trust money and mixed it with £4000 of his own. He used £2137 from the fund to buy shares in the Oceana Company, and dissipated the rest. Then he died. The beneficiaries of the Skipper trust wished to trace their money into the £2475 that were the proceeds of the shares.

Judgment
Joyce J held the beneficiaries could claim the proceeds of the shares. A trustee cannot say the purchased assets were not bought with trust money.

This was just as true as that a trustee cannot rely on Clayton’s case to say that it was the beneficiary’s money taken out first and spent.

See also

English trusts law
Turner v Jacob [2006] EWHC 1317 (Ch), [2008] WTLR 307, Patten J held the Re Hallett presumption of a trustee spending his own money first applies where there are sufficient funds left over in a bank account to satisfy a claim by a beneficiary.
Shalson v Russo [2003] EWHC 1637, [144] suggested the beneficiary can cherry pick whichever is more favourable, as for physical mixtures. 
Foskett v McKeown, para 132, Lord Millett also.

Notes

References

English trusts case law
High Court of Justice cases
1903 in British law
1903 in case law